Anthony Clark Higgins (October 1, 1840 – June 26, 1912) was an American lawyer and politician from Wilmington, in New Castle County, Delaware. He was a veteran of the Civil War and a member of the Republican Party, who served as United States Senator from Delaware.

Early life and family
Higgins was born in Red Lion Hundred in New Castle County, Delaware. He attended Newark Academy and Delaware College, and graduated from Yale College in 1861, where he was a member of Skull and Bones.  After studying law at the Harvard Law School, he was admitted to the bar in 1864 and began practice in Wilmington, Delaware. He also served for a time in the Union Army in 1864.

Professional and public career
Higgins was appointed deputy Attorney General in 1864 and was the United States attorney for Delaware from 1869 until 1876. He was an unsuccessful Republican candidate for election to the 49th Congress in 1884, but was elected to the United States Senate and served from March 4, 1889, until March 3, 1895, when he unsuccessfully sought reelection. During his tenure he was Chairman of the Committee to Examine Branches of the Civil Service in the 51st and 52nd Congress, and a member of the Committee on Manufactures in the 52nd Congress. Subsequently, he resumed the practice of law in Wilmington, including service as one of the attorneys for the respondent in the impeachment proceedings of United States District Court Judge Charles Swayne of Florida in 1904/05.

Death and legacy
Higgins died while at New York, New York, and is buried at the St. Georges Cemetery, near St. Georges in New Castle County.

Almanac
Elections are held the first week of November. The General Assembly chose the U.S. Senators, who took office March 4 for a six-year term.

Notes

References

External links
Biographical Directory of the U.S. Congress
Delaware's Members of Congress
 

Political Graveyard 
Delaware Historical Society; website; 505 North Market Street, Wilmington, Delaware 19801; (302) 655-7161
University of Delaware; Library website; 181 South College Avenue, Newark, Delaware 19717; (302) 831-2965

1840 births
1912 deaths
People from Wilmington, Delaware
Yale College alumni
Harvard Law School alumni
Delaware Republicans
United States Attorneys for the District of Delaware
Republican Party United States senators from Delaware
Burials in New Castle County, Delaware
19th-century American politicians
People from New Castle, Delaware
Psi Upsilon